José Carlos Prieto (born 22 November 1989) is a Chilean footballer that currently plays for Primera División club Deportes Iquique as a central midfielder.

Honours

Club
Deportes Iquique
 Primera B (1): 2010
 Copa Chile (1): 2010

External links
 Prieto at Football Lineups
 

1989 births
Living people
Chilean footballers
Deportes Iquique footballers
Municipal Mejillones footballers
Chilean Primera División players
Primera B de Chile players
Association football midfielders
People from Iquique